The 1989 NCAA Rifle Championships were contested at the ninth annual competition to determine the team and individual national champions of NCAA co-ed collegiate rifle shooting in the United States. The championship was held at (what is now known as) the Pat Spurgin Rifle Range at Murray State University in Murray, Kentucky. 

West Virginia, with a team score of 6,234, retained the team championship, finishing 54 points ahead of South Florida. It was the Mountaineers second consecutive and fifth overall national title.

The individual champions were, for the smallbore rifle, defending titlist Deb Sinclair (Alaska–Fairbanks), and, for the air rifle, Michelle Scarborough (South Florida).

Qualification
Since there is only one national collegiate championship for rifle shooting, all NCAA rifle programs (whether from Division I, Division II, or Division III) were eligible. A total of seven teams ultimately contested this championship.

Results
Scoring:  The championship consisted of 120 shots by each competitor in smallbore and 40 shots per competitor in air rifle.

Team title

Individual events

References

NCAA Rifle Championship
NCAA Rifle Championships
1989 in shooting sports
NCAA Rifle Championships